Alexandre is the French, Portuguese, Catalan and Galician form of the masculine given name Alexander. Alexander means warrior or defender of mankind. 

Notable people with the name include:

Alexandre, Chevalier de Chaumont (1640–1710), French ambassador
Alexandre, vicomte Digeon (1771–1826), cavalry officer in the French Revolutionary Wars
Alexandre Aja (born 1978), French film director
Alexandre Baptista, Portuguese footballer
Alexandre de Beauharnais, French political figure and general during the French Revolution
Alexandre Bilodeau, Canadian skier
Alexandre Bissonnette, Canadian terrorist
Alexandre Brasseur, French actor
Alexandre Cingria (1879–1945), Swiss artist
Alexandre Desplat, French film composer
Alexandre Dupuis (born 1990), Canadian football player
Alexandre Dumas (1802–1870), French writer
Alexandre Gustave Eiffel (1832–1923), French civil engineer, best known for the Eiffel tower
Alexandre Farnoux, French historian and Minoan archaeologist
Alexandre Gaydamak, French businessman, co-owner and chairman of Portsmouth F.C.
Alexandre Herculano, Portuguese novelist and historian
Alexandre Lacazette, French footballer for Arsenal F.C.
Alexandre Lippmann (1881–1960), French 2x Olympic champion épée fencer
Alexandre Sarnes Negrão, Brazilian race car driver
Alexandre José Oliveira, Spanish-Brazilian football player
Alexandre O'Neill, Portuguese poet
Alexandre Pétion, Haitian President
Alexandre Pato, Brazilian footballer
Alexandre Quintanilha, Portuguese scientist
Alexandre de Serpa Pinto, Portuguese explorer
Alexandre Alves da Silva, Brazilian football player
Alex Song, Cameroonian football player
Alexandre Sperafico, Brazilian driver
Alexandre Trudeau, Canadian filmmaker and journalist
Alexandre Vauthier, French fashion designer
Alexandre Yersin (1863–1943), Swiss-French doctor, explorer and bacteriologist
Alexandre Yokochi, Portuguese swimmer
Philippe Alexandre Autexier (1954–1998), French music historian and masonic researcher

French masculine given names
Galician masculine given names
Portuguese masculine given names